Nirmala Kotalawala MP (born 29 September 1965) was Sri Lanka's Deputy Minister of Highways and a Member of Parliament representing the Kalutara Electoral District.

He was a student at Nalanda College Colombo. In 1997 he was elected Chairman of the Pradeshiya Saba Dodamgoda, a position for which he held for two years. Kotalawala was also a member of the Western Provincial Council between 1999 and 2004.

References

 Biographies of Present Members

1965 births
Living people
Sri Lankan Buddhists
Alumni of Nalanda College, Colombo
Members of the 13th Parliament of Sri Lanka
Members of the 14th Parliament of Sri Lanka
Sinhalese politicians